Cornelius Schwehr (born 23 December 1953) in Freiburg im Breisgau is a German composer.

Career 
From 1971 to 1975 he took composition lessons with Walter Heck in Freiburg. This was followed by studies from 1975 to 1981 in music theory with Peter Förtig, composition with Klaus Huber and guitar at the Hochschule für Musik Freiburg. From 1981 to 1983 he studied composition with Helmut Lachenmann at the State University of Music and Performing Arts Stuttgart. From 1981 to 1995 he was a lecturer in Freiburg, Karlsruhe and at the Zurich University of the Arts. Since 1995, he has been a professor of composition, music theory, and the writing of films scores at the Freiburg Musikhochschule. Over his career, he has composed many musical works for different settings and instruments.

On behalf of ZDF/ARTE, he composed a new film score for the silent film Der müde Tod by Fritz Lang, which premiered in 2016 and was broadcast on ARTE.

Since 2009 he has been a member of the Academy of Arts, Berlin.

Awards 
 FilmArtFestival Mecklenburg-Pomerania: Best music and sound design for Age of Cannibals.

References

External links 
 Website von Cornelius Schwehr
 
 The Cabinet Of Dr Caligari (1920) [Cornelius Schwehr chamber acoustic score (YouTube

1953 births
Living people
20th-century classical composers
German composers
German opera composers
German film score composers
Academic staff of the Zurich University of the Arts
Academic staff of the Hochschule für Musik Freiburg
Members of the Academy of Arts, Berlin